Hijos del Culo is the fifth album by the Argentine rock band Bersuit Vergarabat, released in 2000.

Track listing
"El Gordo Motoneta" [The Scooter Fat] (Cordera, Céspedes) – 3:54
"La Del Toro" [Bull's Song] (Cordera, Suárez) – 4:05
"El Viejo De Arriba" [The Oldman from Upstairs] (Subirá) – 3:26
"Canción De Juan" [John's Song] (Cordera, Céspedes) – 5:36
"Desconexión Sideral" [Sideral Desconection] (Subirá) – 4:51
"Porteño De Ley" (Verenzuela) – 3:46
"Caroncha" (Cordera) – 5:05
"La Petisita Culona" [The Big Ass Runt] (Verenzuela, Righi) – 3:37
"Toco Y Me Voy" [Touch and Go] (Subirá, Céspedes) – 4:09
"La Vida Boba" [The Dork Life] (Cordera) – 4:59
"Grasún" (Subirá, Martin) – 3:58
"Negra Murguera" (Subirá, Céspedes) – 5:50
"La Bolsa" [The Bag] (Subirá, Cordera, Martín, Céspedes, Righi, Verenzuela) – 3:32
"Veneno De Humanidad" [Humanity Poison] (Subirá, Céspedes, Cordera) – 5:17
"Es Importante" [It's Important] (Cordera, Céspedes, Martín) – 3:29

Charts and sales

References

2000 albums
Bersuit Vergarabat albums
Albums produced by Gustavo Santaolalla